Héctor Melesio Cuén Ojeda (born October 25, 1955) is a Mexican chemist, pharmacist, biologist and politician. He was a rector of the Autonomous University of Sinaloa and Municipal President of Culiacan, Sinaloa between January 2011 and February 2012.

He was born on 25 October 1955, in Badiraguato, Sinaloa, Mexico. He studied at the Autonomous University of Sinaloa, where he earned a PhD. After graduating from the university, he returned and was its rector from 2005 to 2009.

See also
 List of presidents of Culiacán Municipality

References

1955 births
Living people
Mexican biologists
Mexican chemists
People from Badiraguato
Autonomous University of Sinaloa alumni
21st-century Mexican politicians
Municipal presidents in Sinaloa
Politicians from Sinaloa
Heads of universities and colleges in Mexico